"Every Shade of Blue" is a 1995 song by English musical duo Bananarama, from their seventh album, Ultra Violet. Originally released in Japan as a double A-side with "I Found Love", the track was gradually released throughout 1995 and 1996 in several different countries – each time on a different independent dance label, as Bananarama did not have a major-label contract at the time. Their native United Kingdom did not get a release of this single or the Ultra Violet album.

The sentiments and sound of the song are melancholic and diverge from the upbeat nature of the majority of their hits. "Every Shade of Blue" reached number 124 in Australia and number 41 on Billboards Hot Dance Singles Sales chart in the United States.

In 2010, Bananarama re-recorded the song. This new version appeared on the B-side of the group's single "Love Don't Live Here".

Critical reception
Larry Flick from Billboard wrote that the song is "standard Euro-NRG fare that benefits from producer Gary Miller's ability to balance solid song arrangements with spine-crawling dance rhythms." He also added the track as a "vibrant single". Dave Sholin from the Gavin Report commented that Bananarama is now a twosome, and on the strength of this "slice of rhythmic pop, they stand a good chance of scoring their first success in this decade."

Music video
The music video was directed by fashion designer Roland Mouret and features footage of the two girls singing the song while sitting on the floor. These shots are interspersed with brief images of three young men who either pose for the camera or play with a soccer ball.

Track listings
German CD single
"Every Shade of Blue" (radio version) – 4:11
"Every Shade of Blue" (Mix 1 Vox Hi) – 5:36 ( "Euromix" & "A La Mode Mix")
"Every Shade of Blue" (Lenny Bertoldo radio mix) – 4:00
"Every Shade of Blue" (12" Fab Four mix for Cleveland City) – 6:25
"Every Shade of Blue" (Armand van Helden's Ruffneck mix) – 8:02

US 12-inch single
"Every Shade of Blue" (X-tended club mix) – 6:05
"Every Shade of Blue" (Armand van Helden's Ruffneck mix) – 8:02
"Every Shade of Blue" (12" Fab Four mix for Cleveland City) – 6:25
"Every Shade of Blue" (Mix 1 Vox Hi) – 5:36 (a.k.a. "Euromix" & "A La Mode Mix")
"Every Shade of Blue" (album version) – 4:01

Charts

References

1995 singles
Bananarama songs
Songs written by Sara Dallin
Songs written by Keren Woodward
Avex Trax singles
1995 songs
Quality Records singles
Curb Records singles
ZYX Music singles